Canada's Top Ten is an annual honour, compiled by the Toronto International Film Festival and announced in December each year to identify and promote the year's best Canadian films. The list was first introduced in 2001 as an initiative to help publicize Canadian films.

The list is determined by tabulating votes from film festival programmers and film critics across Canada. Films must have premiered, either in general theatrical release or on the film festival circuit, within the calendar year; although TIFF organizes the vote, films do not have to have been screened specifically at TIFF to be eligible.

Originally, only a single list of 10 films was released. Although both short and feature films were eligible, the list was dominated primarily by feature films. Accordingly, in 2007 TIFF expanded the program, instituting separate Top Ten lists for feature films and short films. However, both lists remain inclusive of both narrative fiction and documentary films.

Each year's list was formerly screened as a Canada's Top Ten minifestival, held in January of the following year. Prior to 2010, the films were screened at the Art Gallery of Ontario's Jackman Theatre as part of TIFF's Cinematheque Ontario program; following the opening of the TIFF Bell Lightbox in 2010, the festival was staged at that venue thereafter. For the 2014 festival, TIFF introduced a People's Choice Award for the feature film program, modeled on the existing Toronto International Film Festival People's Choice Award and conducted in the same manner.

In 2018, TIFF discontinued the January festival, instead introducing a new model in which each film receives its own standalone theatrical run at the Lightbox in the following year.

Once per decade, TIFF also polls Canadian film critics and festival programmers to determine a list of the Top 10 Canadian Films of All Time, separately from the annual Canada's Top Ten survey.

In a 2022 article, Barry Hertz of The Globe and Mail praised the program as a diverse overview of the creative risk-taking in Canadian cinema, and a worthwhile contrast to the limited scope of conventional commercial film distribution.

2000s

2010s
Films which won the People's Choice Award are bolded and marked with a †.

2020s

References

Toronto International Film Festival
Lists of Canadian films